Quebrada El Ciprián  is a corregimiento in Las Minas District, Herrera Province, Panama with a population of 919 as of 2010. It was created by Law 41 of April 30, 2003.

References

Corregimientos of Herrera Province